Jan Born (born March 30, 1958 in Celle, Germany) is a neuroscientist who researches the role of sleep in memory consolidation, problem solving, and brain plasticity. He is Head of the Institute of Medical Psychology and the Behavioral Neurobiology department at the University of Tübingen.

Born serves as the Deputy Editor of SLEEP, the Section Editor of Neurobiology of Learning and Memory, and the Associate Editor of the Journal of Sleep Research.

In 1988 Born received the Marius Tausk-Award from the German Society for Endocrinology. In 2010 he received the Leibniz Award of the Deutsche Forschungsgemeinschaft. In 2017, he received the Oswald-Külpe Award, with the award citation emphasizing that in his "very innovative studies, he was able to prove that it is not REM sleep, but deep sleep that is crucial for the transmission of information to the long-term memory of the brain and thus for memory formation."

Born is a member of the Academy of Sciences Leopoldina.

Biography 
Born studied psychology, mathematics, and medicine at the University of Tübingen and the University of Ulm from 1976–1980. He was a research fellow from 1980–1981 in the Department of Biological Psychology at the State University of New York at Stony Brook. He attended the University of Tübingen where he obtained his Ph.D. in Psychology in 1985. As a graduate student, Born investigated the use of potential-related events in studying brain function in humans. After completing his doctorate, Born completed his habilitation in psychology at the University of Ulm (1985-1989). Born was Professor of Physiological Psychology at the Otto-Friedrich-University Bamberg (1989–1998) and Professor of Neuroendocrinology at the University of Lübeck (1999–2010) before joining the faculty of the University of Tübingen as Chair of Medical Psychology in 2010.

Born's work has been supported by Deutsche Forschungsgemeinschaft and by the Federal Ministry of Education and Research.

Research 
Born researches and publishes in the field of memory formation during sleep. He was one of the first researchers to show that sleep was causally related to memory. He showed that procedural memories are not consolidated by REM sleep, as has been previously assumed. Instead, he showed that procedural memories are improved when REM sleep is pharmacologically suppressed.

Born found that slow-wave sleep reactivates recently encoded memories while REM sleep stabilizes them. As well, his research demonstrated that slow-wave sleep actually consolidates immunological memories (it helps the immune system to identify antigens) as well as psychological memories. He also found that sleep especially assists in consolidating memories that involve a promise of reward.

His other work focuses on the metabolic and behavioral control of body weight.

Representative Publications

References

External links 

Faculty Home Page
Google Scholar Profile
German Wikipedia Biography

German neuroscientists
Neuropsychologists
Academic staff of the University of Tübingen
Living people
1958 births